Diakidis is a surname. Notable people with the surname include:

Themistoklis Diakidis (1882–1944), Greek athlete
Ioannis Diakidis (1867–1962), Greek writer